The Sudost is a river in Bryansk Oblast in Russia and Chernihiv Oblast in Ukraine. It is a right tributary of the Desna. Some sections of the river form the Russia–Ukraine border.

The river freezes up in November and December, and stays icebound until late March–early April.

The town of Pochep and the urban-type settlement of Pogar stand on the river.

References

Rivers of Bryansk Oblast
Rivers of Chernihiv Oblast